is a Japanese fashion model and actress. She appeared in Kamen Rider Kiva as Megumi Aso, one of the lead heroines. She also starred in Kamen Rider Kiva: King of the Castle in the Demon World as this role. She also had a guest appearance as Phantom Thief Selene in Task 13 of GoGo Sentai Boukenger. She also plays an important role in Forbidden Siren 2, a survival horror game for the PlayStation 2 console, where her face model and voice was implemented for main character Ikuko Kifune (木船 郁子 Kifune Ikuko).

Filmography

TV, cinema, movie, game

 2008 - Kamen Rider Kiva (Tokusatsu series, TV Asahi) as Megumi Aso
 2008 - Kamen Rider Kiva The Movie: The King of Hell Castle as Megumi Aso
 2006 - GoGo Sentai Boukenger as Phantom Thief Selene
 2006 - Forbidden Siren 2 (PlayStation 2) as Ikuko Kifune
 2003 - Battle Royale II: Requiem as Mayu Hasuda

Discography
 "Feel the same" with Yu Takahashi, 2008
 "Inherited-System", 2008

References

 Official website 
 *七色の心絵* -nana yanagisawa- - Personal blog

External links
 

Japanese female models
1987 births
People from Yokohama
Living people
Japanese actresses